The Issoire APM 40 Simba is a four-seat light aircraft manufactured by the French manufacturer Issoire Aviation. It is entirely built from carbon-fiber-reinforced polymers. The aircraft's first flight was on 19 May 2009, and it made its public debut at the Paris Air Show in June 2009.

It is a derivative of the 2-seater APM 20 Lionceau and 3-seater APM 30 Lion.

Variants
APM 40 Simba
Powered by a continental IO-240F.
APM 41 Simba 915iS
Powered by a Rotax 915iS. Scheduled to enter service in Q1 of 2017.

Specifications

References

External links

  Issoire Aviation
  Philippe Moniot aircraft

Low-wing aircraft
2000s French civil utility aircraft
Single-engined tractor aircraft
Aircraft first flown in 2009
APM40